"Hold Me" is a song by Dutch singer-songwriter's Anouk and Douwe Bob. The song was released in the Netherlands on 16 January 2015 as a digital download. The song was released as the lead single from Douwe Bob's second studio album Pass It On (2015). The song peaked to number 2 on the Dutch Singles Chart.

Track listing

Chart performance

Weekly charts

Release history

References

2015 singles
2014 songs
Douwe Bob songs
Songs written by Anouk (singer)
Universal Music Group singles